Vincent Sakaria (born 17 October 1995 in New Zealand) is a New Zealand rugby union player who plays for  in the National Provincial Championship. His playing position is prop.

Reference list

External links
itsrugby.co.uk profile

1995 births
New Zealand rugby union players
Living people
Rugby union props
Wellington rugby union players